Resin Dogs is an Australian hip hop group, formed in Brisbane, Queensland in 1996. Resin Dogs are a loose collective, a cut and paste sample band who use live drums, live bass, and elements of hip hop via turntables and samplers to create all forms of ritual dance sounds. The Resin Dogs consist of Dave Atkins, DJ Katch, Dennis Kudelka, Jonothan Bolt and Tony McCall (both also of Final Days of Autumn), with regular guest appearances in Australia by Hau Latukefu (a.k.a. Hau) (Koolism), N'Fa Forster-Jones (a.k.a. Nfamas) (1200 Techniques) and on their overseas touring they appear with Abstract Rude (ATU) (US), Mystro (Natural Born Spitter) (UK), and BluRum13 (Canada).

Biography
The Resin Dogs were formed in 1996, releasing their debut EP, Grinnin''', on their own label, Hydrofunk, in 1997.  This was followed by subsequent EPs, Volcanic Lab (1998) and Daily Trouble (2000), with the track, "Say Yeah", receiving airplay on Triple J making its way up the Australian Independent Records (AIR) charts.

In 2000 Resin Dogs signed a distribution deal with Virgin Records/EMI for their record label, Hydrofunk, and released their debut album, Grand Theft Audio. This was followed by a second EP, Live Like Dogs (2002).  During the recording of their second album, two singles were released "Set It Off", featuring underground artist Abstract Rude from the USA, and "Take Off" with Sydney’s Good Buddha on vocals.

In 2003 they released the follow-up, Hi Fidelity Dirt (21 September 2003), also on Hydrofunk. The band’s two albums continue to attract strong sales and widespread praise from critics and fans. Vinyl sales of Grand Theft Audio have increased steadily on an annual basis (with over 29,000 copies sold). After their distribution deal with Virgin lapsed, they signed a deal with MGM.

Collaborators with the band, outside its three-man core lineup, include MC DNO ("Shin Ki Row", "Decipher"), percussionist Peter Neville ("Trout Fishing in Quebec"), DJ Ransom, Ben Ely (of Regurgitator), Abstract Rude (of Haiku D'Etat and Abstract Tribe Unique), Lazy Grey, Robert Reed (of Trouble Funk), Mad Doctor X, Kenny Dope, Super Dense Child, and most recently The Pharcyde, Jungle Brothers and Spikey Tee, Brad Baloo (The Nextmen), Mystro (Natural Born Spitter), YungGun, Mc Wrec (London Electricity), Demolition Man, BluRum13, N'Fa (1200 Techniques), Hau (Koolism).

Resin Dogs have won three Australian Dance Music Awards – Best Hip Hop Act (2001) and two Best Live Act (2002, 2003). and took out a quarter final spot in the acclaimed International Song Writers Competition with their tune "Fine Mess" Featuring Yungun (UK) in 2007.

Resin Dogs have performed at almost every major Australian festival, including Livid, Homebake Meredith, Woodford, East Coast Blues & Roots Music Festival and at the Big Day Out for seven years. Organisers of Meredith Music Festival said of Resin Dogs performance “…the best 90 minutes of live groove ever seen in the bush". In 2004 and 2005 the Resin Dogs performed concerts across Australia, New Zealand, Japan, UK and Europe (including the Sziget Festival, Hungary, and at the Colours of Ostrava in the Czech Republic).

An invitation from The Black Eyed Peas saw Resin Dogs support the band on their Australian tour in October 2004. Resin Dogs also made an appearance at the world’s largest WOMAD Festival at Reading in England and had a sell-out show at Cargo, the popular London club.

In 2005, Electronic Arts featured one of the group's songs, "Definition", in the 2006 FIFA World Cup video game.  "Definition" was released as an EP/Single in February 2006 and features ARIA winning MC Hau (Koolism), MC Mystro (Low Life) and The Pharcyde.

2007 saw the release of the Resin Dogs' third studio album, More (3 November 2007) on the Hydrofunk label, distributed by MGM. The album was co-produced by Brad Baloo (The Nextmen), with contributions from Abstract Rude (US), Aceyalone, Mikah 9, and Demolition Man (UK). The album was Triple J's 'feature album' in December 2007 with the first track lifted from the album, "Coming with the Sound", receiving airplay on Triple J, Nova (Brisbane) and community radio stations across Australia.

In 2009 Dave Atkins formally joined Wolfmother as the band's new drummer. The band performed at two benefit concerts to be held in Melbourne and Sydney on 14 March for Sound Relief, supporting victims of the Victorian bushfires. The new lineup began recording its first album in March 2009.

In July 2009 the band's album More was released in Europe, receiving great reviews from critics and fans alike.

Discography
Studio albums

Live albums

Remix albums

Extended plays

Singles

Awards and nominations
AIR Awards
The Australian Independent Record Awards (commonly known informally as AIR Awards) is an annual awards night to recognise, promote and celebrate the success of Australia's Independent Music sector. (The commenced in 2006)

|-
| AIR Awards of 2008
|More'' 
| Best Independent Hip Hop Album
|

Queensland Music Awards
The Queensland Music Awards (previously known as Q Song Awards) are annual awards celebrating Queensland, Australia's brightest emerging artists and established legends. They commenced in 2006.
 
|-
|2019
| "Pack Your Bags" 
| Hip Hop / Rap Song of the Year
| 
|-

References

External links
Official website
Hydrofunk website

Australian hip hop groups
Musical groups from Brisbane
Musical groups established in 1996